Salapian is a subdistrict of Langkat Regency. Javanese people are in the majority (56% as of 2007) with 37% Karo. As against Karo Regency, the vast majority of Karo in Salapian are Muslims - the population is 81% Muslim and 13% Protestant. In all parts of Salapian, there is a Muslim majority, although it varies between villages. There are 53 mosques, 40 mushollas, 22 churches, and 2 vihara in the subdistrict.

The biggest town in Salapian is Tanjung Langkat, on the road between Medan, Binjai, Kuala and Bohorok.

The subdistrict is fairly large (511 square km), and the majority of roads are mere dirt tracks, with many in terrible condition. It borders Selesai to the north, Karo Regency to the south, Kuala and Selesai to the east, and Bohorok to the west. Population as of 2007 was 51,114.

References

Langkat Regency